Rohit Prakash Srivastava (born 8 May 1980) is an Indian cricketer. He played in 35 first-class and 23 List A matches for Uttar Pradesh from 2000 to 2012, including a spell as the team's captain.

See also
 List of Uttar Pradesh cricketers

References

External links
 

1980 births
Living people
Indian cricketers
Uttar Pradesh cricketers
Cricketers from Allahabad